Grillo is an Italian surname. Notable people with the surname include:

 Angelo Grillo, Italian poet and lyricist who wrote madrigals for Claudio Monteverdi
 Antonio Grillo (footballer, born 1986), Italian football defender 
 Antonio Grillo (footballer, born 1991), Italian football defender
 Beppe Grillo, Italian comedian and politician
 Casey Grillo, American drummer
 Chuck Grillo, American professional ice hockey executive
 Edward Grillo, American mobster
 Elisabetta and Francesca Grillo, defendants in R v Grillo and Grillo
 Emiliano Grillo, Argentine professional golfer
 Ernesto Grillo, Argentine football player 
 Frank Grillo, American actor
 Friedrich Grillo, German industrialist
 Gabriela Grillo, German equestrian and businesswoman
 Giovanni Battista Grillo, Venetian composer and organist (late 16th century–mid-November 1622)
 Janet Grillo, American filmmaker and screenwriter
 Leo Grillo, American film actor, producer and animal welfare activist
 Manuela Grillo, Italian sprinter
 Natasha Grillo, Italian professional racing cyclist
 Niccolò Grillo, Italian composer
 Odhise Grillo, Albanian writer of children's books
 Paride Grillo, Italian cyclist
 Roger Grillo, American ice hockey player and coach 
 Santiago Grillo, Colombian windsurfer
 Tyran Grillo, Japanese writer and translator
 Yusuf Grillo, Nigerian painter

Fictional characters:
 Jack Grillo, video game character

See also
 Javier Grillo-Marxuach, television screenwriter and producer

Italian-language surnames